Lidia Havriștiuc (born 27 March 1991) is a Romanian footballer which currently plays for FC Augsburg. She left Olimpia Cluj after a row with the club's chairman Alin Cioban, which was accused of holding off her contract extension and registering it with the football federation only when she decided to leave the club, in order to force the new club to pay a transfer sum. She also played for the Romanian national team as a defender.

Honours

Club
Olimpia Cluj 
 Romanian Superliga (1): 2015–16

References

1991 births
Living people
Romanian women's footballers
Romania women's international footballers
Sportspeople from Suceava
Women's association football defenders
FCU Olimpia Cluj players